Pidonia densicollis is a species of the Lepturinae subfamily in the long-horned beetle family. This beetle is distributed in the United States.

References

Lepturinae
Taxa named by Thomas Lincoln Casey Jr.
Beetles described in 1914